Prudnik is a river of the Czech Republic and Poland. The river originates under the mountain Czapka. Its longest confluent is Złoty Potok.

The name of the river is a Bohemized form of "Prądnik". The name of it also became a name of the city of Prudnik.

Rivers of Opole Voivodeship
Rivers of the Moravian-Silesian Region
Rivers of Poland
International rivers of Europe
Prudnik